Mirliva or Mîr-i livâ was a military rank of the Ottoman Army and Navy. It corresponds to a brigadier general (modern Turkish: Tuğgeneral) in the modern Turkish Army. Mirliva is a compound word composed of Mir (commander) and Liva (or Liwa, "brigade" in Arabic). The rank was junior to the Ferik (Major General) and superior to the rank Miralay (Senior Colonel) in the Ottoman Army and the pre-1934 Turkish Army.

Mirliva was the most junior general rank with the title Pasha.

The collar mark (later shoulder mark) and cap of a Mirliva had three stripes and one star during the early years of the Turkish Republic. The Ottoman Army and pre-1934 Turkish Army had three general ranks (similar to the British ranking system), while the current Turkish Army has four general ranks (similar to the American ranking system), with the inclusion of general (Orgeneral) as the fourth introduced in 1934.

The title and rank of Mirliva was abolished with Act No. 2590 of 26 November 1934 on the Abolition of Titles and Appellations such as Efendi, Bey or Pasha.

Sources

See also 
Comparative military ranks of World War I
Sanjak-bey

Military ranks of the Ottoman Empire
Turkish words and phrases